Sri Sathya Sai Prasanthi Nilayam (station code: SSPN) is a major railway station and is located around 8 km to the west of the pilgrim town of Puttaparthi in Andhra Pradesh, India. Puttaparthi is  a renowned pilgrim center and the location of the ashram of Sathya Sai Baba. The station comes under the jurisdiction of Bangalore division of South Western Railways. It has four platforms and is situated on the line connecting Dharmavaram and Penukonda.

Performance and Earnings
The table below shows the passenger earnings of the station previous years.

References

Bangalore railway division
Railway stations in Anantapur district